Horse Hollow is a valley in Ripley County in the U.S. state of Missouri.

Horse Hollow most likely was named for horses employed in the local lumber industry.

References

Valleys of Ripley County, Missouri
Valleys of Missouri